was a Japanese amateur pitcher originally from Ichinomiya, Aichi. He had 23 wins at Spring and Summer Koshien. In the National High School Baseball Championship between 1931 and 1933, he won 14 consecutive games at Koshien Stadium and he became the only pitcher to win three consecutive championships.

Three consecutive high school championships 
Yoshida entered Chukyo Shogyo. He defeated Yoshiyuki Iwamoto's Kōryō in his quarterfinal game of 1931. He won the first championship in 1931.

He defeated Masaru Kageura's Matsuyama Shogyo in his final game of 1932, and won the second championship in 1932.

He defeated Fumio Fujimura's Taishō in his quarterfinal game of 1933. On August 19, 1933, Yoshida pitched a shutout with 336 pitches and 25 innings in his semifinal game against Akashi. Although he was exhausted by this game, he achieved his third consecutive championship the next day.

Later career and HOF induction 
He never joined Nippon Professional Baseball, instead continuing to play as an amateur pitcher.

In honor of his unprecedented pitching at Koshien, Yoshida was inducted to the Japanese Baseball Hall of Fame in 1992. No high schools have ever achieved three consecutive victories since Yoshida's team recorded the feat.

References

External links
Masao Yoshida (Japanese Baseball Hall of Fame)

1914 births
1996 deaths
Baseball people from Aichi Prefecture
People from Ichinomiya, Aichi
Japanese baseball players